UK Championships may refer to:

UK Athletics Championships, an athletics competition only open to competitors from the United Kingdom
UK Championship, a professional ranking snooker tournament
UK Championship (golf), a professional golf tournament on the European Tour
Formula Renault UK championship, one of the British Formula Renault Championship Formula Renault championships
TCR UK Touring Car Championship
WWE United Kingdom Championship, a professional wrestling championship owned by WWE
 National Scrabble Championship (UK), a British national tournament for the Scrabble board game
 UK Beatbox Championships
 Air Guitar UK Championships
 UK Rock Paper Scissors Championships
UK Championship (International Federation of Strength Athletes)
 K*bot UK Championships, a qualifying competition for the K*bot World Championships
 Argentine Tango UK Official Championship

See also
British Championships (disambiguation)